Scott Wiper (born July 22, 1970) is an American writer, film director, and actor. He grew up in northeast Ohio and graduated from Wesleyan University in 1992, then moved to Los Angeles to start his first movie.

He wrote, directed, and starred in A Better Way to Die. Wiper's was the co-writer and director of the action thriller, The Condemned, starring WWE's "Stone Cold" Steve Austin. Wiper wrote the screenplay for The Cold Light of Day, starring Henry Cavill, Bruce Willis and Sigourney Weaver. He also directed the WWE Film The Marine 3: Homefront starring WWE wrestler The Miz.

Filmography
 The Big Ugly (2020) - Director, writer, producer
The Marine 4: Moving Target (2015) - characters
The Marine 3: Homefront (2013) - writer, director
The Cold Light of Day (2012) - writer
The Condemned (2007) - writer, director
Jolly Good Fellow (2006) - actor
Landspeed (2002) - actor
Pearl Harbor (2001) - actor
A Better Way to Die (2000) - writer, director, actor
The Last Marshal (1999) - writer
Captain Jack (1996) - writer, director, producer, editor, actor
The Return of Wes Lauren (1992) - writer, director, producer, editor, actor

References

External links
 

1970 births
Living people
Wesleyan University alumni
People from Granville, Ohio
Film directors from Ohio